George Wright may refer to:

Politics, law and government 
George Wright (MP) (died 1557), MP for Bedford and Wallingford
George Wright (governor) (1779–1842), Canadian politician, lieutenant governor of Prince Edward Island
George Wright (jurist) (1917–1975), Australian judge
George Wright (lawyer) (1847–1913), Solicitor General for Ireland
George Wright (trade unionist), National Secretary of Australian Labor Party
George F. Wright (1881–1938), American politician, mayor of Honolulu
George G. Wright (1820–1896), United States senator from Iowa
George Melendez Wright (1904–1936), American biologist, National Park Service
George Merrill Wright (1865–?), American businessman and politician
George Washington Wright (1816–1885), United States congressman from California
George Wright (Jamaican politician), Jamaican member of parliament

Sports 
George Wright (sportsman) (1847–1937), American baseball player/manager, also active in golf and tennis
George Wright (footballer, born 1919) (1919–?), English football goalkeeper
George Wright (footballer, born 1930) (1930–2000), English football player
George Wright (footballer, born 1969), Scottish football player (Heart of Midlothian FC)
George Wright (New Zealand footballer), New Zealand international football (soccer) player
George Wright (American football) (born 1947), NFL player
George Wright (outfielder) (born 1958), American baseball player
George Wright (triple jumper) (born 1963), Canadian triple jumper
George Wright (infielder) (1882–?), pre-Negro leagues baseball player
George Wright (bowls) (1893–1949), English bowls player
Bert Wright (footballer) (George Albert Wright, 1920–?), English soccer player

Others 
George Wright (artist) (18601944), British artist noted for his sporting and coaching scenes.
George Wright (bishop) (1873–1956), Anglican bishop
George Wright (fugitive) (born 1943), Portuguese criminal, alleged hijacker of Delta Air Lines Flight 841 in 1972 
George Wright (general) (1803–1865), American soldier and Civil War General
George Wright (organist) (1920–1998), American organist
George Wright (priest), Anglican priest in Ireland
George Wright (psychologist) (born 1952), British psychologist
George Caleb Wright (1889–1973), American architect
G. Ernest Wright (1909–1974), American biblical scholar and archaeologist
George Frederick Wright (1838–1921), American geologist and professor
George Hand Wright (1872–1951), American painter, illustrator and printmaker
George Henry Wright (1849–1912), Nova Scotian businessperson, social reformer and Titanic victim
George Newenham Wright (c. 1794–1877), Anglo-Irish author and Anglican clergyman
G. S. Wright (George Speller Wright, 1845–1935), South Australian banker